Echinarachniidae is a family of echinoderms belonging to the order Clypeasteroida.

Genera

Genera:
 Astrodapsis Conrad, 1856 
 Echinarachnius Gray, 1825 
 Faassia Shmidt, 1971

References

Clypeasteroida
Echinoderm families